Antaeotricha aratella is a moth in the family Depressariidae. It was described by Francis Walker in 1864. It is found in Amazonas, Brazil.

Adults are wood colour, the forewings whitish in front, brownish hindward, with some irregular blackish streaks and with a blackish patch on the middle of the interior border.

References

Moths described in 1864
aratella
Moths of South America